Mount Bohemia is the 5th highest point in the Keweenaw Peninsula and the 52nd highest prominent peak in Michigan with an elevation of .
Mount Bohemia is host to a ski resort bearing the same name located at the northernmost portion of the Keweenaw Peninsula in Mohawk, Michigan. Mount Bohemia operates two chairlifts, and offers the 2nd highest vertical drop in the Midwest behind Terry Peak in the Black Hills of South Dakota, and ahead of Lutsen Mountains, located in the Sawtooth Mountains of northern Minnesota. The resort has 95 runs and first opened for business in 2000.

Mount Bohemia does not operate any snow making equipment and relies on its  year average of lake effect snow, the most seen at any resort in the Midwest.  Because runs are not groomed, Mount Bohemia is not an appropriate resort for beginners.  It offers only single and double black diamond level runs (no green beginner or blue intermediate trails).

Mount Bohemia also offers the only Cat skiing experience in the midwest at Voodoo Mountain.

References 

 Official Website of resort
 https://web.archive.org/web/20120130021316/http://www.michiganskier.com/Ski-Resort-Guide.html
 http://www.startribune.com/lifestyle/travel/106761868.html

Tourist attractions in Keweenaw County, Michigan
Ski areas and resorts in Michigan
Buildings and structures in Keweenaw County, Michigan
Geography of Keweenaw County, Michigan